Hingurakgoda Airport ( Hingurakgoda Guwanthotupala), also known as Minneriya Airport, is a domestic airport in Hingurakgoda, Sri Lanka. It is also a military airbase known as Sri Lanka Air Force Base Hingurakgoda.

History
This base was an RAF airfield, RAF Minneriya during World War II from 1942 to 1946, which was renovated and re-established by the Sri Lanka Air Force in 1978.

Facilities
SLAF Hingurakgoda is the fourth-largest airport in Sri Lanka and has the fourth-longest runway in Sri Lanka. The runway can easily accommodate narrow-body aircraft like Airbus A320 family, Boeing 737 and Boeing 757. It can also tightly handle wide-body aircraft like Airbus A300, Airbus A330, Boeing 767, Boeing 777 or even at emergencies a Boeing 747.

The airport's sole runway is not equipped with ILS (Instrument Landing System), thus all approaches and takeoffs are performed visually.

Airlines and destinations

Lodger Squadrons
 No. 7 Helicopter Squadron
 No. 9 Attack Helicopter Squadron

References

External links
 Sri Lanka Air Force Base Hingurakgoda

Airports in Sri Lanka
Sri Lanka Air Force bases
Buildings and structures in North Central Province, Sri Lanka
World War II sites in Sri Lanka